Sex Madness is a 1938 exploitation film directed by Dwain Esper, along the lines of Reefer Madness, supposedly to warn teenagers and young adults of the dangers of venereal diseases, specifically syphilis.

Plot

This exploitation film belongs to the social guidance genre of quasi-documentary narratives, which exhort young adults to follow particular moral and social prescriptions related to sexuality and drug use.

The film centers on Paul Lorenz, a "concerned citizen" alarmed at the spread of venereal diseases such as syphilis and gonorrhea. However, at a New York City burlesque show, several protagonists are more intent on engagement in sexual pleasure, regardless of the subsequent costs. They include Paul's own son Tom, burlesque dancer Sheila Wayne (who has syphilis), and two secretaries, lesbian Peggy and Betty, whom she is trying to seduce. However, one figure is not amongst them—Millicent Hamilton, a reformed former burlesque dancer. Millicent won a beauty contest in her hometown, which led her to New York, but a "casting couch" sexual encounter led her to contract syphilis. Millicent is told by her physician, Dr. Hamilton, that her condition can be cured, but only after slow, and painstaking treatment, and she should reject quack pseudo-cures. Millicent consents to this, eager to return to her home town and marry her boyfriend Wendell, but will she heed the doctor's warnings? And what will the consequences be if she does not?

Wild parties, lesbianism, and premarital sex are portrayed or heavily implied in various scenes. The promotion of the film for "educational" purposes allowed it to portray taboo subjects that were otherwise forbidden by the Motion Picture Production Code of 1930, especially after those restrictions were strictly imposed on Hollywood productions after July 1934.

Cast
 Vivian McGill as Millicent Hamilton
 Rose Tapley as Mrs. Hamilton
 Al Rigali as Mr. Hamilton
 Mark Daniels as Wendel Hope
 Linda Lee Hill as Sheila Wayne
 Ruth Edell as Mrs. Fay
 Charles Olcott as Paul Lorenz
 Ed Redding as Dr. Hampton

Status
The film has fallen into the public domain and can be freely downloaded from the Internet Archive.

Sex Madness Revealed
In 2018, the film Sex Madness Revealed was released by Kino Lorber. Sex Madness Revealed features an audio commentary track over the original film, which features comedian Patton Oswalt and magician/actor Rob Zabrecky telling a fictitious history of the film. Sex Madness Revealed premiered at the Overlook Film Festival in April 2018. The film was directed by Tim Kirk and written by Kirk and Patrick Cooper.

See also

 Cult film
 Exploitation film
 Reefer Madness
 List of films in the public domain in the United States

References

External links

 
 
 
 

1938 films
American social guidance and drug education films
American black-and-white films
American sexploitation films
American LGBT-related films
Lesbian-related films
Films directed by Dwain Esper
Films about sexually transmitted diseases
Films about syphilis
Articles containing video clips
American drama films
1938 drama films
1930s English-language films
1930s American films